The 2010 NASCAR Nationwide Series was the twenty-ninth season of semi-professional stock car racing in the United States. Beginning at Daytona International Speedway, the season included thirty-five races, which ended with the Ford 300 at Homestead Miami Speedway. Brad Keselowski clinched the drivers' championship during the O'Reilly Auto Parts Challenge at Texas Motor Speedway, two races before the season finale at Homestead, while  Joe Gibbs won the owners' championship (for the No. 18 car, driven by Kyle Busch and Brad Coleman). Toyota won the manufacturers' championship with 240 points.

During the 2009 off-season, NASCAR announced few calendar changes, including moving the race at Memphis Motorsports Park to Gateway due to the closure of Memphis. The short track of Milwaukee was also replaced with the road course at Road America, which hosted its first NASCAR race since a Cup race in 1956.

This was also the last season where Cup Series drivers could run for points in the series. NASCAR implemented this change after Cup drivers were winning the Busch/Nationwide championships over the series regulars for five years straight (2006–2010).

Schedule

Schedule changes: Phoenix and Nashville moved ahead of Texas in April. The spring race at Dover preceded the Charlotte weekends due to the extra week in May before Memorial Day. Because of the closure of the Memphis track, Gateway International Raceway in Madison, Illinois, also hosted a second race in October. Milwaukee was dropped from the schedule due to issues with the promoters, as the Wisconsin State Fair was attempting to hire a new promoter following the previous promoter's sanctioning fee nonpayment.  That date went to Road America.

Note: all race dates, names, distances, television and radio stations and start times are subject to change.

The total distance of the season will be .
♣ – This race was run using the new Nationwide Series Car of Tomorrow.

Teams

Complete schedule

Limited schedule

Nationwide Car of Tomorrow
NASCAR announced in October 2009 that the Nationwide Series' Car of Tomorrow will make its debut in 2010 in four races. Those races were the July race at Daytona International Speedway, the August race at Michigan International Speedway, the September race at Richmond International Raceway, and the October race at Charlotte Motor Speedway

The new cars featured the new safety improvements of the Sprint Cup Car of Tomorrow including a larger greenhouse area, however they included a molded front splitter and a classic style spoiler (instead of the Sprint Cup's wing). The new cars also are designed to look more like their street counterparts than the Sprint Cup Car of Tomorrow. Chevrolet continued to run the Impala and Toyota continued to run the Camry nameplates, however Dodge ran the Challenger and Ford will run the Mustang.

TV and radio

United States
ESPN held the broadcast rights for Nationwide Series races. Most events was broadcast on ESPN or ESPN2 in the United States. Practice and qualifying sessions was broadcast on SPEED or ESPN2 depending on their agreements.

International
The Nationwide Series was broadcast in Australia on Network Ten's Digital sports channel, ONE, in Standard and High Definition.  Broadcasts included both full races, typically on a Sunday morning, local time, and 1-hour highlights packages several times during the week. Live flag-to-flag coverage of the races in shown on SPEED for Latin America.

2010 season races

Drive4COPD 300
The DRIVE4COPD 300 was held February 13 at Daytona International Speedway. Tony Stewart won the race.

Did not qualify: Jeremy Clements (#0), Kevin Lepage (#56), Johnny Borneman III (#83), Brett Rowe (#75), Derrike Cope (#73), Johnny Chapman (#92), Jason Keller (#35), Shelby Howard (#70).

Stater Bros. 300
The Stater Bros. 300 was held February 20 at Auto Club Speedway. Joey Logano took the pole but Kyle Busch won the race.

Did not qualify: Morgan Shepherd (#89), Danny O'Quinn Jr. (#90), Stephen Leicht (#91), Johnny Chapman (#92), Andy Ponstein (#02), Jeremy Clements (#04).

Sam's Town 300
The Sam's Town 300 was held February 27 at Las Vegas Motor Speedway. Brad Keselowski took the pole but Kevin Harvick won the race.

Did not qualify: Jason Keller (#35), Johnny Chapman (#92), Derrike Cope (#73), Jeremy Clements (#04), Stephen Leicht (#91), Johnny Borneman III (#83), Andy Ponstein (#02), Morgan Shepherd (#89).

Scotts Turf Builder 300
The Scotts Turf Builder 300 was held March 20 at Bristol Motor Speedway. Brad Keselowski took the pole but Justin Allgaier won the race.

Did not qualify: Dennis Setzer (#96), Mark Green (#49), Scott Riggs (#09), Jason Bowles (#39), Brad Teague (#04), Parker Kligerman (#42), Chris Lawson (#52).

Nashville 300
The Nashville 300 was held April 3 at Nashville Superspeedway. Joey Logano took the pole but Kevin Harvick won the race.

Did not qualify: Chase Miller (#91), Dennis Setzer (#92), Tim Schendel (#52), Andy Ponstein (#02) Brett Rowe (#75).

Bashas' Supermarkets 200
The Bashas' Supermarkets 200 was held April 9 at Phoenix International Raceway. Carl Edwards took the pole but Kyle Busch won the race.

Did not qualify: Mark Green (#70).

O'Reilly 300
The O'Reilly 300 was held April 19 at Texas Motor Speedway. Joey Logano took the pole but Kyle Busch won the race.

Did not qualify: Jason Keller (#35), Derrike Cope (#73), Josh Wise (#61), Morgan Shepherd (#89).

Aaron's 312
The Aaron's 312 was held April 25 at Talladega Superspeedway. Kevin Harvick took the pole but Brad Keselowski won the race.

Did not qualify: Kevin Lepage (#56), Willie Allen (#05), Jeremy Clements (#04), Josh Wise (#61), Derrike Cope (#73).

NOTE: Brad Keselwoski suffered a 50-point penalty for infractions discovered during post race inspection.

BUBBA Burger 250
The BUBBA Burger 250 was held April 30 at Richmond International Raceway. Kyle Busch took the pole but Brad Keselowski won the race.

Did not qualify: Danny O'Quinn Jr. (#90).

The Royal Purple 200 was held May 7 at Darlington Raceway. Denny Hamlin took the pole and won the race.

Did not qualify: Willie Allen (#05), Johnny Chapman (#96), Morgan Shepherd (#89).

NOTE: Kasey Kahne suffered a 25-point penalty for an illegal shock found on his car.

Heluva Good! 200
The Heluva Good! 200 was held May 15 at Dover International Speedway. Kyle Busch took the pole and won the race.

Did not qualify: Brian Keselowski (#26), Danny O'Quinn Jr. (#39).

The TECH-NET Auto Service 300 was held May 29 at Charlotte Motor Speedway. Carl Edwards took the pole but Kyle Busch won the race.

Did not qualify: Derrike Cope (#73), Parker Kligerman (#42), Brian Keselowski (#26).

Federated Auto Parts 300
The Federated Auto Parts 300 was held June 5 at Nashville Superspeedway. Justin Allgaier took the pole but Brad Keselowski won this race.

Did not qualify: Kevin Lepage (#56), Ricky Stenhouse Jr. (#6).

NOTE: Tayler Malsam, who finished 11th, and Jason Leffler, who finished 34th, were given a 25-point penalty for an "illegal transfer of tires."

Meijer 300
The Meijer 300 was held June 12 at Kentucky Speedway. Joey Logano took the pole and won the race.

Did not qualify: Kenny Hendrick (#52), Brian Keselowski (#26).

Bucyrus 200 presented by Menards
The Bucyrus 200 was held June 19 at Road America. It was the first NASCAR-sanctioned race at Road America in Wisconsin. Carl Edwards took the pole in the #60 Fastenal Ford Fusion and led 35 laps. Because of the unique layout of the track, Road course ringers such as Tony Ave, Ron Fellows, Jacques Villeneuve, Patrick Long, J. R. Fitzpatrick, Kevin O'Connell and Alex Kennedy were picked up by numerous teams to substitute for Nationwide Series regulars. Jacques Villeneuve was one of 2 road ringers to lead laps in the race (the other being Patrick Long), though Edwards was able to hold off Ron Fellows to win the race.

Did not qualify: None, only 43 entries.

New England 200
The New England 200 was held June 26 at New Hampshire Motor Speedway. Brad Keselowski took the pole but Kyle Busch won the race.

Did not qualify: Chris Lawson (#52), Peyton Sellers (#25).

Subway Jalapeño 250 presented by Coca-Cola
The Subway Jalapeño 250 was held July 2 at Daytona International Raceway. Brad Keselowski took the pole but Dale Earnhardt Jr. won the race.

Did not qualify: Carl Long (#68).

Dollar General 300 powered by Coca-Cola (Chicagoland)
The Dollar General 300 was held July 9 at Chicagoland Speedway. Kevin Harvick took the pole but Kyle Busch won the race.

Did not qualify: Jeremy Clements (#04), Kevin Hamlin (#36), Brian Keselowski (#26), Jennifer Jo Cobb (#13).

Missouri-Illinois Dodge Dealers 250
The Missouri-Illinois Dodge Dealers 250 was held July 17 at Gateway International Raceway. Trevor Bayne took the pole but Carl Edwards won the race.

Did not qualify: Chris Lawson (#52), Derrike Cope (#73), Jeremy Clements (#04), Michael McDowell (#81).

NOTE: Carl Edwards suffered a 60-point penalty after intentionally wrecking Brad Keselowski on the last lap of the race.

Kroger 200 benefiting Riley Hospital for Children
The Kroger 200 was held July 24 at O'Reilly Raceway Park. Trevor Bayne took the pole but Kyle Busch won the race.

Did not qualify: None, only 43 entries.

NOTE: Aric Almiorla suffered a 25-point penalty for unknown reasons.

U.S. Cellular 250
The U.S. Cellular 250 was held July 31 at Iowa Speedway. Trevor Bayne took the pole but Kyle Busch won the race.

Did not qualify: Eric McClure (#24), Daryl Harr (#02), Johnny Chapman (#89).

Zippo 200 at The Glen
The Zippo 200 was held August 7 at Watkins Glen International. Marcos Ambrose took the pole and won the race.

Did not qualify: None, only 43 entries.

Carfax 250
The Carfax 250 was held August 14 at Michigan International Speedway. Brad Keselowski took the pole and won the race.

Did not qualify: Johnny Chapman (#89).

Food City 250
The Food City 250 was held August 20 at Bristol Motor Speedway. Elliott Sadler took the pole but Kyle Busch won the race.

Did not qualify: Kevin Lepage (#56), Eric McClure (#24), Drew Herring (#43), Morgan Shepherd (#89), Ryan Hackett (#76), J. J. Yeley (#61), Chris Lawson (#52).

NAPA Auto Parts 200 presented by Dodge
The NAPA Auto Parts 200 was held August 29 at Circuit Gilles Villeneuve. Marcos Ambrose took the pole in the #47 Toyota, and although he controlled the race early on, he lost a spark wire with less than 20 laps to go. Then the race was controlled by Robby Gordon who went on to run out of gas on the final restart, giving the race to road course ringer Boris Said. It was the first win by a road course ringer since Ron Fellows' victory at this track in 2008.

Did not qualify: Stanton Barrett (#41), Kevin O'Connell (#31), Pierre Bourque (#61).

Great Clips 300
The Great Clips 300 was held September 4 at Atlanta Motor Speedway. Kasey Kahne took the pole but Jamie McMurray won the race.

Did not qualify: Jeremy Clements (#04).

Virginia 529 College Savings 250
The Virginia 529 College Savings 250 was held September 10 at Richmond International Raceway. Kevin Harvick took the pole and won the race.

Did not qualify: Danny Efland (#07).

Dover 200
The Dover 200 was held September 25 at Dover International Speedway. Joey Logano took the pole but Kyle Busch won the race.

Did not qualify: Stephan McCurley (#51), Alan Tardiff (#39), Donnie Neuenberger (#52), Matt Carter (#82), Kevin Lepage (#56).

Kansas Lottery 300
The Kansas Lottery 300 was held October 2 at Kansas Speedway. Joey Logano took the pole and won the race.

Did not qualify: Andy Ponstein (#92), Johnny Chapman (#89), Daryl Harr (#02), Stephan McCurley (#51), Mark Green (#49), Willie Allen (#05).

CampingWorld.com 300
The CampingWorld.com 300 was held October 9 at Auto Club Speedway. Kyle Busch took the pole and won the race.

Did not qualify: Johnny Chapman (#89), Eric McClure (#24).

Dollar General 300 (Charlotte)
The Dollar General 300 was held October 15 at Charlotte Motor Speedway. Clint Bowyer took the pole but Brad Keselowski won the race.

Did not qualify: Carl Long (#68), Morgan Shepherd (#89).

5-Hour Energy 250
The 5-Hour Energy 250 was held October 23 at Gateway International Raceway. Justin Allgaier took the pole but Brad Keselowski won the race.

Did not qualify: Willie Allen (#05), Mark Green (#49), Tim Schendel (#52), Eric McClure (#24).

O'Reilly Auto Parts Challenge
The O'Reilly Auto Parts Challenge was held November 6 at Texas Motor Speedway. James Buescher took the pole but Carl Edwards won the race.

Did not qualify: Chase Miller (#82), Carl Long (#94), Brian Keselowski (#26), Danny O'Quinn Jr. (#90), Jeff Green (#36), Morgan Shepherd (#89), Mark Green (#49), Mike Harmon (#13).

WYPALL 200 powered by Kimberly-Clark Professional
The WYPALL 200 was held November 13 at Phoenix International Raceway. Joey Logano took the pole but Carl Edwards won the race.

Did not qualify: Brett Rowe (#89), Eric McClure (#24), Daryl Harr (#02), Kevin Lepage (#52), Chase Miller (#82), Carl Long (#94).

Ford 300
The Ford 300 was held November 20 at Homestead-Miami Speedway. Joey Logano took the pole but Kyle Busch won the race.

Did not qualify: Michael McDowell (#81), Danny O'Quinn Jr. (#90), Tim Andrews (#79), Sean Caisse (#39).

Final standings

Drivers 
The top 10

Full Drivers' Championship
(key) Bold – Pole position awarded by time. Italics – Pole position set by owner's points. * – Most laps led.

More: Official standings

Declaring for points in one series: Rules change for 2011 
This was the last season where Cup Series drivers could run for points in another series. NASCAR implemented this change after Cup drivers were winning the Busch/Nationwide championships over the series regulars for 5 years straight (2006-2010). If the change had been implemented for the 2010 season, Allgaier would have been the champion. The rest of the top 10 in the standings would have been Bayne in 2nd, Leffler, Steve Wallace, Brendan Gaughan (who finished 11th in points), Reed Sorenson (12th), Michael Annett (13th), Brian Scott (14th), Mike Bliss (15th), and Ricky Stenhouse Jr. (16th).

See also

2010 NASCAR Sprint Cup Series
2010 NASCAR Camping World Truck Series
2010 NASCAR Corona Series
2010 NASCAR Mini Stock Series
2010 NASCAR Canadian Tire Series

NASCAR Xfinity Series seasons